The 2021–22 Harvard Crimson men's basketball team represented Harvard University in the 2021–22 NCAA Division I men's basketball season. The Crimson, led by 14th-year head coach Tommy Amaker, played their home games at the Lavietes Pavilion in Boston, Massachusetts as members of the Ivy League.

Previous seasons
Due to the COVID-19 pandemic, the Ivy League chose not to conduct a season in 2020–21. 

The Crimson finished the 2019–20 season 21–8 overall, 10–4 in Ivy League play, finishing second in the regular season standings. The team qualified for the Ivy League tournament, but due to COVID-19 concerns the Tournament was canceled on March 10.

Roster

Schedule and results

|-
!colspan=12 style=| Non-conference regular season

|-
!colspan=9 style=| Ivy League regular season

|-

Source

References

Harvard Crimson men's basketball seasons
Harvard Crimson
Harvard Crimson men's basketball
Harvard Crimson men's basketball
Harvard Crimson men's basketball
Harvard Crimson men's basketball